Eucelatoria argentea is a species of tachinid flies in the genus Eucelatoria of the family Tachinidae.

Distribution
Trinidad and Tobago.

References

Endemic fauna of Trinidad and Tobago
Diptera of North America
Exoristinae
Insects described in 1968